Elections to the Haryana Legislative Assembly were held in May 1982. No party gained a majority of seats.

Results

Elected members

Controversy
In the 1982 election, the INC emerged as a single largest party with 36 seats but INLD and BJP has pre poll alliance and got 37 seats in total. As no party has clear cut majority, it resulted in a hung assembly and was left to governor's discretion to whom to call upon to form government.

G.D. Tapase (Governor of Haryana) first called on Devi Lal on 22 May 1982 (leader of INLD or LKD + BJP alliance) to prove his majority by morning of 24 May. But in mean time, Bhajan Lal fresh from his re-election as leader of the INC+Individuals(36+16=52) met the governor and was sworn in as Chief Minister.

But in election of 1987, haryana people gave a clear cut majority to LKD or INLD and BJP alliance with overwhelming majority of 76(60+16) out of 90 assembly seats whereas INC suffers a humiliating defeat and won just 5 out of 90 seats as compared 36 seats in last assemble election.

See also 
 Girraj Kishore Mahaur

References

1982
1982
Haryana